Vítor Viana (Rio de Janeiro, 23 December 1881 — Rio de Janeiro, 21 August 1937) was a Brazilian journalist, lawyer and historian. He was an advocate of "modern democracy" and member of the Academia Brasileira de Letras from 1935.

References

1881 births
1937 deaths
Writers from Rio de Janeiro (city)
Brazilian journalists
20th-century Brazilian lawyers
20th-century Brazilian historians
20th-century journalists